Robin Wall Kimmerer (born 1953) is an American Distinguished Teaching Professor of Environmental and Forest Biology; and Director, Center for Native Peoples and the Environment, at the State University of New York College of Environmental Science and Forestry (SUNY-ESF).

She is the author of numerous scientific articles, and the books Gathering Moss: A Natural and Cultural History of Mosses (2003), and Braiding Sweetgrass: Indigenous Wisdom, Scientific Knowledge and the Teachings of Plants (2013). An audiobook version was released in 2016, narrated by the author. Braiding Sweetgrass was republished in 2020 with a new introduction.

She is an enrolled member of the Citizen Potawatomi Nation, and combines her heritage with her scientific and environmental passions.

Early life and education
Robin Wall Kimmerer was born in 1953 in Upstate New York to Robert and Patricia Wall. Her time outdoors rooted a deep appreciation for the natural environment. Her enthusiasm for the environment was encouraged by her parents, who began to reconnect with their own Potawatomi heritage while living in upstate New York. Kimmerer is an enrolled member of the Citizen Potawatomi Nation.

Kimmerer remained near home for college, attending State University of New York College of Environmental Science and Forestry and receiving a bachelor's degree in botany in 1975. She spent two years working for Bausch & Lomb as a microbiologist. Kimmerer then moved to Wisconsin to attend the University of Wisconsin–Madison, earning her master's degree in botany there in 1979, followed by her PhD in plant ecology in 1983. It was while studying forest ecology as part of her degree program,  that she first learnt about mosses, which became the scientific focus of her career.

Career

From Wisconsin, Kimmerer moved to Kentucky, where she briefly taught  at Transylvania University in Lexington before moving to Danville, Kentucky where she taught biology, botany, and ecology at Centre College. Kimmerer received tenure at Centre College. In 1993, Kimmerer returned home to upstate New York and her alma mater, ESF, where she currently teaches.

Kimmerer teaches in the Environmental and Forest Biology Department at ESF. She teaches courses on Land and Culture, Traditional Ecological Knowledge, Ethnobotany, Ecology of Mosses, Disturbance Ecology, and General Botany. Director of the newly established Center for Native Peoples and the Environment  at ESF, which is part of her work to provide programs that allow for greater access for Indigenous students to study environmental science, and for science to benefit from the wisdom of Native philosophy to reach the common goal of sustainability.

Kimmerer is a proponent of the Traditional Ecological Knowledge (TEK) approach, which Kimmerer describes as a "way of knowing." TEK is a deeply empirical scientific approach and is based on long-term observation. However, it also involves cultural and spiritual considerations, which have often been marginalized by the greater scientific community. Wider use of TEK by scholars has begun to lend credence to it.

Kimmerer's efforts are motivated in part by her family history. Her grandfather was a member of the Citizen Potawatomi Nation, and received colonialist schooling at the Carlisle Indian Industrial School in Carlisle, Pennsylvania. The school, similar to Canadian residential schools, set out to "civilize" Native children, forbidding residents from speaking their language, and effectively erasing their Native culture. Knowing how important it is to maintain the traditional language of the Potawatomi, Kimmerer attends a class to learn how to speak the traditional language because "when a language dies, so much more than words are lost."

Her current work spans traditional ecological knowledge, moss ecology, outreach to Indigenous communities, and creative writing.

Professional service

Kimmerer has helped sponsor the Undergraduate Mentoring in Environmental Biology (UMEB) project, which pairs students of color with faculty members in the enviro-bio sciences while they work together to research environmental biology. Kimmerer is also a part of the United States Department of Agriculture's Higher Education Multicultural Scholars Program. The program provides students with real-world experiences that involve complex problem-solving. Kimmerer is also involved in the American Indian Science and Engineering Society (AISES), and works with the Onondaga Nation's school doing community outreach. Kimmerer also uses traditional knowledge and science collectively for ecological restoration in research. She has served on the advisory board of the Strategies for Ecology Education, Development and Sustainability (SEEDS) program, a program to increase the number of minority ecologists. Kimmerer is also the former chair of the Ecological Society of America Traditional Ecological Knowledge Section.

In April 2015, Kimmerer was invited to participate as a panelist at a United Nations plenary meeting to discuss how harmony with nature can help to conserve and sustainably use natural resources, titled "Harmony with Nature: Towards achieving sustainable development goals including addressing climate change in the post-2015 Development Agenda."

Honors and awards
Kimmerer received the John Burroughs Medal Award for her book, Gathering Moss: A Natural and Cultural History of Mosses. Her first book, it incorporated her experience as a plant ecologist and her understanding of traditional knowledge about nature. Her second book, Braiding Sweetgrass: Indigenous Wisdom, Scientific Knowledge, and the Teachings of Plants, received the 2014 Sigurd F. Olson Nature Writing Award. By 2021 over 500,000 copies had been sold worldwide. Braiding Sweetgrass is about the interdependence of people and the natural world, primarily the plant world. She won a second Burroughs award for an essay, "Council of the Pecans," that appeared in Orion magazine in 2013. Kimmerer received an honorary M. Phil degree in Human Ecology from College of the Atlantic on June 6, 2020.

In 2022 Kimmerer was awarded the MacArthur "genius" award.

Books
 Gathering Moss: A Natural and Cultural History of Mosses (Oregon State University Press, 2003) .
 Braiding Sweetgrass: Indigenous Wisdom, Scientific Knowledge, and the Teachings of Plants (Milkweed Editions, 2013) .

References

Sources
 History. (n.d.). Retrieved April 4, 2021, from https://www.pokagonband-nsn.gov/our-culture/history
 Potawatomi history. (n.d.). Retrieved April 4, 2021, from https://www.mpm.edu/content/wirp/ICW-152
 Sultzman, L. (December 18, 1998). Potawatomi History. Retrieved April 6, 2021, from http://www.tolatsga.org/pota.html 
 CPN Public Information Office. (November 3, 2015). Q & A With Robin Wall Kimmerer, Ph.D. Citizen Potawatomi Nation. https://www.potawatomi.org/q-a-with-robin-wall-kimmerer-ph-d/

Further reading
 
 Pember, Mary Annette. (22 February 2007). "Another Frame of Mind". In Diverse: Issues in Higher Education.
 Tompkins, Joshua. (30 November 2004). "Moss hunters roll away nature's carpet, and some ecologists worry," The New York Times.

External links

 Robin Wall Kimmerer Official Website
 Ecologists Directory
 Leadership Initiative for Minority Female Environmental Faculty (LIMFEF) Kimmerer Bio
 May Memorial Unitarian Universalist Society Podcast featuring Kimmerer reading a poem, February 11, 2007
 Interview on podcast "Ologies with Alie Ward"
Conversation between Kimmerer and artist Olivia Whetung, hosted by the Campbell River Art Gallery, November 18, 2020
 RealScience.org: Threatened Plants
 Robin Wall Kimmerer's SUNY-ESF Faculty Page
SEEDS
 SUNY-ESF Success Stories
Traditional Ecological Knowledge Section  Ecological Society of America
 Whole Terrain link to Kimmerer articles published in Whole Terrain
 Women Transcending Boundaries
 "Weaving Traditional Ecological Knowledge into Biological Education: A Call to Action", Oxford Journal, BioScience, Volume 52, Issue 5, pp. 432–438

American environmentalists
American naturalists
American non-fiction environmental writers
Native American writers
Native American academics
Native American women academics
American women academics
Citizen Potawatomi Nation people
Living people
University of Wisconsin–Madison alumni
1953 births
John Burroughs Medal recipients
Centre College faculty
Plant ecologists
State University of New York College of Environmental Science and Forestry faculty
State University of New York College of Environmental Science and Forestry alumni
Kentucky women botanists
Scientists from New York (state)
20th-century Native American women
20th-century Native Americans
21st-century Native American women
21st-century Native Americans
21st-century American women writers
Native American women writers